Randall Duane Williams (born September 18, 1975) is an American former professional baseball pitcher. He played with the Seattle Mariners, San Diego Padres, Colorado Rockies, Chicago White Sox and Boston Red Sox of Major League Baseball (MLB) from 2004–2011. Williams played college baseball for the Lamar University Cardinals.

Career
Drafted by the Chicago Cubs in the 12th round of the 1997 MLB draft, Williams was released by the Cubs on March 24, . In 42 games, he had a 1.42 ERA and 77 strikeouts.

On September 30, 2002, he signed with the Seattle Mariners and made his  MLB debut on September 11, . He appeared in 6 games for the Mariners in 2004 and during the offseason, he was traded to the San Diego Padres for Billy Hogan. He went 2-1 with the Rockies the rest of the season and had a 5.73 ERA. He became a free agent at the end of the season.

In , he re-signed with the Rockies and played the entire year for their Triple-A affiliate, the Colorado Springs Sky Sox. He became a free agent at the end of the 2008 season and signed a minor league contract with an invitation to spring training the Chicago White Sox on January 12, .

After the 2011 season, he elected for free agency.

In 2012, Williams signed with the Saitama Seibu Lions in Nippon Professional Baseball (NPB).

References

External links

1975 births
Living people
Albuquerque Isotopes players
American expatriate baseball players in Japan
Arizona League Cubs players
Baseball players at the 2011 Pan American Games
Baseball players from Texas
Boston Red Sox players
Chicago White Sox players
Colorado Rockies players
Colorado Springs Sky Sox players
Daytona Cubs players
Edinburg Roadrunners players
Frisco RoughRiders players
Lamar Cardinals baseball players
Major League Baseball pitchers
Nippon Professional Baseball pitchers
Oklahoma RedHawks players
Pan American Games medalists in baseball
Pan American Games silver medalists for the United States
People from Harlingen, Texas
Portland Beavers players
Saitama Seibu Lions players
San Antonio Missions players
San Diego Padres players
Seattle Mariners players
Tacoma Rainiers players
United States national baseball team players
Medalists at the 2011 Pan American Games